Nawaf Al-Mutairi (born 13 April 1989) is a Saudi Arabian handball player for Al-Wehda and the Saudi Arabian national team.

He participated at the 2017 World Men's Handball Championship.

References

1989 births
Living people
Saudi Arabian male handball players
21st-century Saudi Arabian people